is a Japanese former professional boxer who competed from 1993 to 2004, challenging for the OPBF bantamweight title in 1998. As an amateur, he competed in the men's flyweight event at the 1988 Summer Olympics. At the 1988 Summer Olympics, he defeated Simon Morales of Colombia, before losing to Serafim Todorov of Bulgaria.

References

External links
 

1968 births
Living people
Japanese male boxers
Olympic boxers of Japan
Boxers at the 1988 Summer Olympics
Sportspeople from Iwate Prefecture
Flyweight boxers
Bantamweight boxers
Super-bantamweight boxers